Vittadello was an Italian professional cycling team that existed from 1965 to 1968. It was known as Pepsi-Cola for its final season in 1968.

They participated in 4 editions of the Giro d'Italia, earning 7 stage wins. The team also won the 1966 Tour de Suisse with Ambrogio Portalupi.

References

External links

Defunct cycling teams based in Italy
1965 establishments in Italy
1968 disestablishments in Italy
Cycling teams established in 1965
Cycling teams disestablished in 1968